Francis R. Hafner (August 14, 1867 in Hannibal, Missouri – March 2, 1957 in Hannibal, Missouri) was a Major League Baseball player. A right-handed pitcher, Hafner started two games for the Kansas City Cowboys of the American Association in May 1888. He pitched a complete game both times, but allowed 23 runs (14 earned) to score, while surrendering two home runs, throwing six wild pitches, and allowing 41 men to reach base safely.

The total of six wild pitches ranked second in the league, and with one hit batsman Hafner tied for fourth in that category as well. He never pitched in the major leagues again, and the Cowboys themselves lasted only one more season before folding.

Sources

1867 births
1957 deaths
Baseball players from Missouri
Major League Baseball pitchers
Kansas City Cowboys players
People from Hannibal, Missouri
Topeka (minor league baseball) players
Peoria Canaries players
19th-century baseball players